Long Live King George is a 1965 country music album released by George Jones. The album was long thought to be a studio release; however, it is a late Starday Records compilation of Jones recordings throughout the mid- to late 1950s.

The album features many of Jones' early songs, including many of his earliest hits, "You Gotta Be My Baby" from 1956, "Seasons of My Heart" from 1955, and Jones' first chart single "Why Baby Why" in 1955. It lists a track from his third collaboration attempt in 1957 with Virginia Spurlock titled: "No, No, Never".

Background and composition
In late 1956, there were shakeups in some of the top management jobs in Nashville and part of this realignment saw Starday Records, an independent country music label founded in Houston by Jones's producer and mentor H.W. "Pappy" Daily and Jack Starns, absorbed into Mercury Records.  As Colin Escott writes in the liner notes to the Jones retrospective Cup of Loneliness: The Classic Mercury Years, Daily and Starday president Don Pierce were approached to take over Mercury's country roster to form the Mercury-Starday label but "the clincher was the success of George Jones.  After 12 years in the business, Mercury hadn't found one country artist who had promised or delivered half of what George had."  By July 1958, Mercury-Starday dissolved with Pierce assuming control of Starday and Jones remaining at Mercury with Daily producing him.

Jones wrote or co-wrote all of the selections on Long Live King George.  Two selections, "Nothing Can Stop My Love" and "Tall, Tall Trees", were co-written with Jones's friend Roger Miller, the latter becoming a chart-topping country hit for Alan Jackson in 1995.  Jones also collaborated with J.P. Richardson (better known as the Big Bopper) on the upbeat "If I Don't Love You (Grits Ain't Groceries)" (which, aside from the title line, has no relation to the R&B song "Grits Ain't Groceries"). Richardson would also compose "White Lightnin'", which would become Jones's first number one in 1959.

Long Live King George includes several songs, such as his first chart hit "Why Baby Why", that appeared on his 1957 debut album Grand Ole Opry's New Star.   As Jones star continued to rise in the country music field, Starday would continue to release albums featuring recordings by Jones culled from its archive, including several rockabilly sides that the singer detested.  Starday would continue this practice into the 1970s.  Jones would later explain to Nick Tosches in 1994, "There was no such thing as production at Starday.  We’d go in with the band, we’d go over the song, I’d look over and tell the steel player to take a break or kick it off, and I’d get the fiddle to play a turnaround in the middle.  I’d just let them know if we were going to tag it or not. We’d just go through it. We didn’t take the pains of making several takes.  Back then, over three or four takes, they’d say, 'My God, this is costing us money.'  So we’d just get it down as good as we could. If we went a little flat or sharp in a place or two, they’d say, 'The public ain’t going to notice that, so put it out.' So we did, and it wasn’t too successful, so I think maybe the public did notice it."

Track listing

References

1958 compilation albums
George Jones compilation albums
Albums produced by Pappy Daily
Starday Records compilation albums